Bengt Lennart Norberg (born January 21, 1949) is an ice hockey player who played for the Swedish national team. He won a bronze medal at the 1980 Winter Olympics.

References 

1949 births
Living people
Ice hockey players at the 1980 Winter Olympics
Olympic ice hockey players of Sweden
Swedish ice hockey players
Olympic medalists in ice hockey
Olympic bronze medalists for Sweden
Medalists at the 1980 Winter Olympics